Khobi (Xobis municiṗaliṫeṫi) is a district of Georgia, in the region of Samegrelo-Zemo Svaneti. Its main town is Khobi. The population was 30,548, as of the 2014 census.

Politics
Khobi Municipal Assembly (Georgian: ხობის საკრებულო) is a representative body in Khobi Municipality, consisting of 36 members, which is elected every four years. The last election was held in October 2021. Davit Bukia of Georgian Dream was elected mayor through a 2nd round against a candidate of the United National Movement.

Administrative division

There are 1 city and 21 administrative units with 56 villages in the municipality.

1 city - Khobi 

15 communities - Akhalsopeli, Akhali Khibula, Bia, Gurifuli, Zemo Kvaloni, Torsa-Dghvaba, Nojikhevi, May 1, Sajijao, Kariata, Kvemo Kvaloni, Shua Khorga, Chaladidi, Khamiskuri, Kheta;

6 rural communities - Patara Poti, First Khorga, Sagvichio, Kulevi, Shavghele, Old Khibula.

See also 
 List of municipalities in Georgia (country)

References

External links 
 Districts of Georgia, Statoids.com

Municipalities of Samegrelo-Zemo Svaneti